Lioprosopa is a genus of snout moths. It was described by Alfred Jefferis Turner in 1947.

Species
 Lioprosopa adenocera (Turner, 1923)
 Lioprosopa albivena (Turner, 1947)
 Lioprosopa amictodes (Turner, 1947)
 Lioprosopa argosticha (Turner, 1913)
 Lioprosopa haploa Turner, 1947
 Lioprosopa microrrhoda (Turner, 1923)
 Lioprosopa neuricella (Hampson, 1918)
 Lioprosopa poliosticha Turner, 1947
 Lioprosopa rhadinodes Turner, 1947
 Lioprosopa rhantista Turner, 1947
 Lioprosopa rhodobaphella (Ragonot, 1888)
 Lioprosopa rhodosticha (Turner, 1904)

References

Anerastiini
Pyralidae genera